Montcoal is an unincorporated community and coal town in Raleigh County, West Virginia, United States.

Coal mine explosion

Montcoal is home to the Performance Coal Company, a division of Massey Energy, Inc. On April 5, 2010, at approximately 3 pm, a methane gas explosion killed 29 mine workers, and injured two others.

References

Unincorporated communities in Raleigh County, West Virginia
Unincorporated communities in West Virginia
Mining communities in West Virginia
Coal towns in West Virginia